Seema Tarana also spelled as Sima Tarana is an Afghan singer originally from Parwan Province. She is popular in Afghanistan and Tajikistan. She currently resides in Canada.

References

Living people
Afghan Tajik people
Afghan women singers
Persian-language singers
Afghan emigrants to Canada
People from Parwan Province
Afghan expatriates in Canada
21st-century Afghan women singers
Year of birth missing (living people)